The  opened in Kikonai, Hokkaidō, Japan in 2015. The museum is housed in the former Tsuruoka Elementary School, which closed in March 2011. When first opened, the museum exhibited some six hundred objects previously stored by the Kikonai Town Board of Education or donated by members of the public.

The display is divided into four main zones, each with its own room: "Kikonai Long, Long Ago", with artefacts from the sixty-one archaeological sites identified in Kikonai to-date; "History and Development of the Town"; "Industries of Kikonai", with a main focus on farming, forestry, and fishing; and "People's Way of Life and Culture". A fifth room relating to the railways opened in March 2016, on the anniversary of the opening of the museum and to celebrate the connection of Kikonai Station to the Hokkaido Shinkansen; it has some fifteen hundred items relating to the former , the Esashi Line, the days of JNR and JR, and the Seikan ferry that connects Aomori with Hakodate.

See also
 Matsumae Town Historical Museum
 Esashi Town Historical Museum
 Seikan Tunnel

References

External links
 Kikonai Town Museum "Irinkan" 

Kikonai, Hokkaido
Museums in Hokkaido
2015 establishments in Japan
Museums established in 2015